The Best Of Dave Mason is a 1974 album by Dave Mason and was released on the Blue Thumb Records label.

Reception

Allmusic's retrospective review criticised the selection of songs as downright poor for a "best of" compilation, and accused Blue Thumb Records of releasing the album "apparently with no goal other than to confuse record buyers and distract attention from Mason's new releases on Columbia."

Track listing
 "A Heartache, A Shadow, A Lifetime"
 "Only You And I Know"
 "Can't Stop Worrying, Can't Stop Loving"
 "Look At You Look At Me"
 "Walk To The Point"
 "In My Mind"
 "To Be Free"
 "Here We Go Again"
 "Shouldn't Have Took More Than You Gave"

References

External links

Dave Mason albums
Albums produced by Dave Mason
Albums produced by Tommy LiPuma
1974 greatest hits albums